The Osiris blue (Cupido osiris) is a butterfly in the family Lycaenidae. It is found in South Europe, Asia Minor, southern Siberia, the Alay Mountains, Tian-Shan, Dzhungarsky Alatau, the Altai Region, the Sayan mountains, Lake Baikal and Mongolia. It is often confused with the small blue, a closely related species.

The larvae feed on Onobrychis and Leguminosae species.

Description from Seitz

L. sebrus Bdv. (82 c). Above dull violet-blue (male) or black-brown (female). with the markings of  the underside feebly shining through, narrow black margin and white fringes; beneath light ashy grey, the base dusted with blue, the ocelli and the median spot being very delicate. In the Alps, locally plentiful, southwards to Italy, south-eastwards to Asia Minor and eastwards to the Altai. Specimens with the ocelli prolonged occur also in this species, as proved by a fine specimen in Courvoisier's collection: ab. elongata Courv. i. l. — Larva on Onobrychis and Orobus, until April and again in June. The butterflies in the mountains, sporadic, in May and again from the end of June onwards.

References

External links
Leps It: Images of Osiris blue

Cupido (butterfly)
Butterflies of Asia
Butterflies of Europe
Insects of Mongolia
Butterflies described in 1829